Louis E. Brus is the S. L. Mitchell Professor of Chemistry at Columbia University. He is the discoverer of the colloidal semi-conductor nanocrystals known as quantum dots.

Brus received the Franklin Institute's 2012 Bower Award and Prize for Achievement in Science, and was chosen for the 2010 NAS Award in Chemical Sciences. He received the inaugural Kavli Prize for nanoscience in 2008, and was co-recipient of the 2006 R. W. Wood Prize of the Optical Society of America. He received the Distinguished Alumni Award from the Association of Rice University Alumni in 2010.

He was elected to the United States National Academy of Sciences in 2004 and is a member of the Norwegian Academy of Science and Letters.

Career

In 1973, Brus joined AT&T Bell Laboratories, where he did the work that led to the discovery of quantum dots.  In 1996, Brus left Bell Labs and joined the faculty in the Department of Chemistry at Columbia University.

References

External links
Brus group homepage
Brus faculty profile
Biography from the National Academy of Sciences
2010 Distinguished Rice Alumni Award Recipients
Bower Award

1943 births
Living people
Columbia University faculty
Columbia University alumni
Rice University alumni
Members of the Norwegian Academy of Science and Letters
Members of the United States National Academy of Sciences
Kavli Prize laureates in Nanoscience